Gaisser Valley is a mostly ice-free valley,  long, that descends south from Vashka Crag in the Cruzen Range of Victoria Land. Named by the Advisory Committee on Antarctic Names in 2005 after Thomas K. Gaisser, Bartol Research Institute, University of Delaware; United States Antarctic Program principal investigator for the study of cosmic-ray showers at the Amundsen–Scott South Pole Station from 1991 to 2005.

References

Valleys of Victoria Land